Mike Murley (born December 12, 1961) is a Canadian jazz saxophonist and composer from Windsor, Nova Scotia who was a member of the Shuffle Demons from 1984 to 1989 and Time Warp.

Education
He graduated from the music program at York University in Toronto in 1986 with a BFA. He also studied saxophone with Don Palmer in Halifax, Pat LaBarbera in Toronto, and Dave Liebman at the Banff Centre for Arts and Creativity and New York City. He studied improvisation and composition with Dave Holland in Banff and New York City.

Career 
He played with the Shuffle Demons from 1984-1989 and in Time Warp. He has also been a sideman for David Occhipinti, David Braid, Rob McConnell, Metalwood and Harrison Squared (with Harry Vetro and Harrison Argatoff).  
His main instrument is tenor saxophone, which he plays in the Murley/Braid Quartet. He has received several Juno Awards.

References

External links
MikeMurley.com
www.campIMC.ca
[ Allmusic]
Cronica
CBC
Canadian Encyclopedia of Music

1961 births
Canadian jazz saxophonists
Male saxophonists
Living people
York University alumni
Musicians from Nova Scotia
People from Hants County, Nova Scotia
Academic staff of York University
Academic staff of the University of Toronto
Juno Award for Traditional Jazz Album of the Year winners
Juno Award for Best Jazz Album winners
Canadian male jazz musicians
The Shuffle Demons members